Dead Easy is a 1970 Australian film.

Plot
A student of criminology is completing a thesis on Melbourne mass murderers. With the aid of a German professor he visits the scenes of the crimes of Frederick Deeming, Norman List, Arnold Sodeman and Edward Leonski and reconstructs them. One day the students visits the professor and sees him attacked by two strangers. The professor knifes one of the men.

Cast
Peter Carmody as the student
Kurt Beimelas the professor
Anna Raknes as the girlfriend
Peter Cummins as the stranger
David Car as a stranger
Martin Phelan as cameraman
Brian Davies as friend
Bruce Spence as friend
Shirley Carr
Alan Finney

Production
The film was shot in January 1970 in and around Melbourne. It received a limited release.

References

External links
Dead Easy at IMDb
Dead Easy at Oz Movies

Australian thriller films
1970s English-language films
1970 films
1970s thriller films
Films directed by Nigel Buesst
1970s Australian films